Davison County is a county in the U.S. state of South Dakota. As of the 2020 United States Census, the population was 19,956. Its county seat is Mitchell. The county was created in 1873 and organized in 1874. It was named for Henry C. Davison, the first settler in the county.

Davison County is part of the Mitchell, SD Micropolitan Statistical Area.

History
The area's first settlement occurred in 1871 in "Firesteel Creek"; the settlers were Herman Cady Greene and John Head. Greene brought lumber from Yankton in 1872 and built a frame house. The small community which grew around this house was called Firesteel. It became part of a county created by the territorial legislature in 1873.

In 1881 the territorial legislature met and considered two bills redefining the boundaries of Hanson and Davison Counties. They considered adjusting the two counties' boundaries by either combining the two, or changing their method of separation. A public vote determined to add four townships to the west, and split the two previous counties down the middle.

The settlement originally called "Arlandton" was renamed "Mount Vernon" in 1882; by 1883 it boasted a hardware store, a livery stable, lumber yard, drugstore, cigar maker, and a hotel.

During the latter part of the nineteenth century the county was served by railroad spur lines. By the mid-twentieth century, those lines had been abandoned and removed.

Geography
The terrain of Davison County consists of rolling hills. Its area is largely devoted to agriculture. The James River flows south-southeastward through the NE portion of the county. A local drainage flows eastward through the upper quarter of the county, terminating in Lake Mitchell, north of the city of Mitchell. The terrain slopes to the east, and rises toward its SW corner. Its highest point is on the western portion of its southern border, at 1,667' (508m) ASL.

It is the fourth-smallest county in South Dakota by area.

Major highways
  Interstate 90
  South Dakota Highway 37
  South Dakota Highway 42

Adjacent counties

 Sanborn County - north
 Hanson County - east
 Hutchinson County - southeast
 Douglas County - southwest
 Aurora County - west

Demographics

2000 census
As of the 2000 United States Census, there were 18,741 people, 7,585 households, and 4,770 families in the county. The population density was 43 people per square mile (17/km2). There were 8,093 housing units at an average density of 19 per square mile (7/km2). The racial makeup of the county was 96.23% White, 0.27% Black or African American, 1.98% Native American, 0.43% Asian, 0.02% Pacific Islander, 0.30% from other races, and 0.77% from two or more races. 0.69% of the population were Hispanic or Latino of any race. 50.8% were of German, 10.1% Norwegian, 5.5% Irish and 5.4% American ancestry.

There were 7,585 households, out of which 31.10% had children under the age of 18 living with them, 51.40% were married couples living together, 8.20% had a female householder with no husband present, and 37.10% were non-families. 30.80% of all households were made up of individuals, and 13.40% had someone living alone who was 65 years of age or older. The average household size was 2.38 and the average family size was 3.00.

The county population had 25.40% under the age of 18, 12.00% from 18 to 24, 25.90% from 25 to 44, 20.40% from 45 to 64, and 16.20% who were 65 years of age or older. The median age was 36 years. For every 100 females, there were 94.10 males. For every 100 females age 18 and over, there were 91.80 males.

The median income for a household in the county was $33,476, and the median income for a family was $44,357. Males had a median income of $30,825 versus $20,940 for females. The per capita income for the county was $17,879. About 8.20% of families and 11.50% of the population were below the poverty line, including 11.30% of those under age 18 and 10.40% of those age 65 or over.

2010 census
As of the 2010 United States Census, there were 19,504 people, 8,296 households, and 4,892 families in the county. The racial makeup of the county was 94.4% white, 2.5% American Indian, 0.5% Asian, 0.4% black or African American, 0.1% Pacific islander, 0.5% from other races, and 1.6% from two or more races. Those of Hispanic or Latino origin made up 1.5% of the population. In terms of ancestry, 51.8% were German, 10.6% were Norwegian, 10.1% were Irish, 7.4% were English, 6.0% were Dutch, and 4.5% were American.

Of the 8,296 households, 28.1% had children under the age of 18 living with them, 46.6% were married couples living together, 8.5% had a female householder with no husband present, 41.0% were non-families, and 34.3% of all households were made up of individuals. The average household size was 2.26 and the average family size was 2.91. The median age was 37.8 years.

The median income for a household in the county was $41,867 and the median income for a family was $54,677. Males had a median income of $37,688 versus $26,223 for females. The per capita income for the county was $22,794. About 6.9% of families and 13.8% of the population were below the poverty line, including 12.1% of those under age 18 and 10.4% of those age 65 or over.

Communities

Cities
 Mitchell (county seat)
 Mount Vernon

Town
 Ethan

Census-designated place
 Loomis

Townships

 Badger Township
 Baker Township
 Beulah Township
 Blenden Township
 Tobin Township
 Lisbon Township
 Mitchell Township
 Mount Vernon Township
 Perry Township
 Prosper Township
 Rome Township
 Union Township

Politics
Davison County voters traditionally vote Republican in presidential elections, but Bill Clinton managed to pick up a plurality of the county's vote in 1992, and 20 years earlier it gave a majority of its votes to losing Democratic candidate George McGovern, who was brought up in the county seat of Mitchell.

See also
National Register of Historic Places listings in Davison County, South Dakota

References

External links
 Davison County, SD government website

 
1874 establishments in Dakota Territory
Populated places established in 1874
Mitchell, South Dakota micropolitan area